The Nagaland Police is the law enforcement agency for the Indian state of Nagaland. The headquarters of the Nagaland Police is located at Nagaland Police Headquarters in Police Reserve Hill, Kohima. It is headed by the Director General of Police.

Organisational structure
Nagaland Police comes under the direct control of the Department of Home Affairs, Government of Nagaland.
The Nagaland Police is headed by a Director General of Police (DGP), the incumbent (from 2018) being Shri TJ Longkümer, IPS.

The organisational structure of the Nagaland Police includes:
 NAP (Nagaland Armed Police) BATTALIONS
 DISTRICT EXECUTIVE FORCE (DEF)
 NAGALAND POLICE TELE-COMMUNICATION ORG. (NPTO)
 NAGALAND ARMED POLICE TRAINING CENTRE (NAPTC)
 POLICE TRAINING SCHOOL (PTS)
 INTELLIGENCE BRANCH
 CRIME BRANCH (In the Police Headquarters and in every district)
 FORENSIC SCIENCE LABORATORY (FSL)

References

Government of Nagaland
State law enforcement agencies of India
Government agencies with year of establishment missing